Alto Cauquenes Airport,  is an airport serving Cauquenes, a city in the Maule Region of Chile.

Runway length does not include an additional  displaced threshold on Runway 18.

See also

Transport in Chile
List of airports in Chile

References

External links
OpenStreetMap - Alto Cauquenes
OurAirports - Alto Cauquenes
FallingRain - Alto Cauquenes Airport

Airports in Maule Region